Alcantar and its original Spanish form Alcántar is a Spanish surname of moorish origin. It is a variant of Alcántara. The name is derived from that of the town of Alcántara, in the province of Cáceres, Extremadura, Spain. Ultimately, the name is derived from Arabic words meaning the bridge, which in turn is a reference to an actual bridge.

Notable people with this surname include:
 Daniel Alcántar (born 1976), Mexican football player
 David Alcántar (born 1989), Mexican football player
 Norma A. Alcantar, Mexican-American chemical engineer
 Tony Alcantar (born 1960), American actor

References